Inger Pedersen (born 3 May 1936 in Flekkefjord) is a Norwegian politician for the Labour Party.

She was elected to the Norwegian Parliament from Nordland in 1985, and was re-elected on one occasion. She had previously served in the position of deputy representative during the terms 1981–1985.

Pedersen held various positions in Narvik municipality in the periods 1967–1971 and 1983–1987.

References

1936 births
Living people
Labour Party (Norway) politicians
Members of the Storting
Women members of the Storting
20th-century Norwegian politicians
20th-century Norwegian women politicians
People from Flekkefjord